Boronia anceps is a plant in the citrus family, Rutaceae and is endemic to a small area in the south-west of Western Australia. It is a perennial herb with small leaves and pink, four-petalled flowers.

Description
The flowers are pink or pinkish purple and are borne in a cyme on the tip of the stems. The style and stigma are continuous. Flowering occurs from September to December or January.

Taxonomy and naming
Boronia anceps was first formally described in 1998 by Paul G. Wilson and the description was published in Nuytsia from a specimen collected near a crossing on the Scott River near Augusta. The specific epithet (anceps) is a Latin word meaning "two-sided", referring to the shape of the stem.

Distribution and habitat
This boronia grows in seasonally swampy heath and is only known from between the Scott River and Walpole.

Conservation
Boronia anceps is classified as "Priority Two" by the Government of Western Australia Department of Parks and Wildlife meaning that it is poorly known and known from only a few locations but is not under imminent threat.

References

anceps
Flora of Western Australia
Plants described in 1998
Taxa named by Paul G. Wilson